Phragmataecia pectinicornis is a species of moth of the family Cossidae. It is found in South Sudan.

References

Endemic fauna of Sudan
Moths described in 1914
Phragmataecia